Feshanjerd (also Romanized as Feshānjerd; also known as Gūrī Feshānjerd) is a village in Miyan Jovin Rural District, Helali District, Joghatai County, Razavi Khorasan Province, Iran. At the 2006 census, its population was 888, in 227 families.

References 

Populated places in Joghatai County